Ezequiel Lucas Aguirre (born 10 January 1992) is an Argentine professional footballer who plays as a winger for Defensores de Belgrano.

Career
Aguirre started out in the youth of River Plate, appearing at the 2012 U-20 Copa Libertadores by making five appearances and scoring once as they won the competition. In July 2013, Aguirre joined Defensores de Belgrano on loan. He made his professional debut on 13 August 2013 during a goalless draw with Los Andes, prior to netting his first goal in his next appearance against Villa Dálmine on 10 September as they suffered eventual relegation to Primera C Metropolitana. He returned to River Plate in June 2014, before departing permanently to Defensores de Belgrano in the following January.

After four seasons back with Defensores de Belgrano, with Aguirre having scored sixteen goals across one hundred and eight fixtures in the process, they won promotion in 2017–18 to Primera B Nacional. His first goal in the second tier came in a one-nil win over Santamarina on 16 September 2018. Aguirre left the club at the end of the 2020 season, having made one hundred and forty-seven appearances and scored twenty-six goals in six years as a permanent player. February 2021 saw Aguirre head abroad to Honduras to join Olimpia. He scored his first goal on 11 March versus Real de Minas.

Career statistics
.

Honours
River Plate
U-20 Copa Libertadores: 2012

References

External links

1992 births
Living people
Argentine footballers
Argentine expatriate footballers
Footballers from Rosario, Santa Fe
Association football forwards
Club Atlético River Plate footballers
Defensores de Belgrano footballers
C.D. Olimpia players
Independiente Santa Fe footballers
Primera B Metropolitana players
Primera Nacional players
Liga Nacional de Fútbol Profesional de Honduras players
Expatriate footballers in Honduras
Expatriate footballers in Colombia
Argentine expatriate sportspeople in Honduras
Argentine expatriate sportspeople in Colombia